The 2015 World Draughts Championship match  at the international draughts was held October 25–31, 2015 in Izmir, Turkey International Draughts Federation FMJD between the actual World Champion Alexander Georgiev (Russia) and the challenger Jean Marc Ndjofang (Cameroon). Alexander Georgiev won 7-7-6-6 against 7-5-4-12 and became eight times world champion.

Rules and regulations
The match consists of seven micro-matches. Each micro-match is played till the first victory. First game of micro-match — standard game 1 hour 20 min + 1 min per move, if draw at 1st game — rapid game 20 min + 5 sec per move. If draw at rapid game — blitz game 5 min + 3 sec per move.

If draw at blitz game — Lehmann-Georgiev tie break 5 min + 2 sec per move for all games till the first victory.

The final result of the match was determined by the result games with normal time control, if draw was determined by the result rapid games, if draw was determined by the result blitz games.

Results

See also
List of Draughts World Championship winners

References

External links
Site 2015 World Draughts Championship match 

2015 in draughts
Draughts world championships
Sports competitions in Izmir
2015 in Turkish sport
International sports competitions hosted by Turkey
2010s in İzmir